The 2002 Canadian Mixed Curling Championship was held January 5–13 at the Mayflower Curling Club in Halifax, Nova Scotia.

Teams

Standings

Results

Draw 1

Draw 2

Draw 3

Draw 4

Draw 5

Draw 6

Draw 7

Draw 8

Draw 9

Draw 10

Draw 11

Draw 12

Draw 13

Draw 14

Draw 15

Draw 16

Draw 17

Tiebreaker

Playoffs

1 vs. 2

3 vs. 4

Semifinal

Final

External links
Event statistics

References

Canadian Mixed Curling Championship
Curling competitions in Halifax, Nova Scotia
2002 in Canadian curling
2002 in Nova Scotia
January 2002 sports events in Canada